The Verbandsliga Schleswig-Holstein-Nord is the seventh tier of the German football league system and the third-highest league in the German state of Schleswig-Holstein, together with five other leagues at this level in the state. The league was formed at the end of the 2007-08 season to replace the previously existing Bezirksoberligas at this level.

Overview
With the changes to the German football league system in 2008 that went alongside the introduction of the 3. Liga, four new Verbandsligas were formed in Schleswig-Holstein as the sixth tier of the league system, these being:
 Verbandsliga Schleswig-Holstein-Nord (as Nord-West)
 Verbandsliga Schleswig-Holstein-Ost (as Nord-Ost)
 Verbandsliga Schleswig-Holstein-Süd (as Süd-Ost)
 Verbandsliga Schleswig-Holstein-West (as Süd-West)

Previous to that, from 1978 to 2008, a single-division Verbandsliga Schleswig-Holstein existed which was now renamed Oberliga Schleswig-Holstein and received the status of an Oberliga.

These four new Verbandsligas replaced the previously existing four Bezirksoberligas (BOL), who were, until then, divided into northern, southern, eastern and western divisions. The Bezirksoberligas themselves were formed in 1999. Other changes in the league system were the abolishment of the four Bezirksoberligas and the five Bezirksligas below them. Additionally, the regional alignment of the four new Verbandsligas differed from the Bezirksoberligas they replaced, making the change from one to the other more than just a renaming of leagues.

The new Verbandsliga Schleswig-Holstein-Nord was formed from one club of the Verbandsliga Schleswig-Holstein (V), ten clubs from the former Bezirksoberliga Schleswig-Holstein-Nord (VI), five clubs from the Bezirksoberliga Schleswig-Holstein-West (VI), one club from the Bezirksliga Schleswig-Holstein-Nord (VII) and one club from the Kreisliga Schleswig (VIII).

The league champions of each of the six Verbandsligas will earn promotion to the Landesliga Schleswig-Holstein. Below the six Verbandsligas, eleven regional Kreisligas are placed. The bottom teams in the Verbandsligas will be relegated to  the Kreisligas while the champions of those will earn promotion to the Verbandsligas. The Verbandsliga Nord covers the following four Kreise:
 Dithmarschen
 Flensburg
 Nordfriesland
 Schleswig

With DGF Flensborg and IF Stjernen Flensborg, the league has two clubs of the Danish minority in Germany in its ranks. From the 2017–18 season onwards, the Verbandsligas were contracted to 16 teams each and downgraded to seventh tier with the introduction of the new Landesliga Schleswig-Holstein (VI). For the 2020–21 season, however, relegation was suspended after the previous one and the division temporarily contracted to 12 teams, losing four to the recreated Nord-Ost group.

League champions

 In 2009 ETSV Weiche was promoted instead of SG Sylt-Haddeby.
 In 2018 and 2019 IF Stjernen Flensborg and MTV Tellingstedt were also promoted respectively as runners-up.
 In 2020 the season was abandoned due to the coronavirus pandemic in Germany and table placings were determined by points per game averages. Büdelsdorfer TSV was also promoted as runner-up.

Founding members
The league was formed from 18 clubs, which played in the following leagues in 2007-08: 
 From the Verbandsliga Schleswig-Holstein:
 ETSV Weiche, 14th
 From the Bezirksoberliga Schleswig-Holstein-Nord:
 TSB Flensburg, 2nd
 FC Angeln 02, 3rd
 SV Frisia 03 Lindholm, 4th
 IF Stjernen Flensborg, 5th
 MTV Leck, 6th
 TSV Rantrum, 7th
 SpVgg Flensburg 08 II, 8th
 FC Sörup- Sterup, 9th
 DGF Flensborg, 10th
 VFR Schleswig, 11th
 From the Bezirksoberliga Schleswig-Holstein-West:
 TSV Nordhastedt, 2nd
 TuRa Meldorf, 3rd
 MTV Tellingstedt, 4th
 BW Wesselburen, 6th
 Marner TV, 7th
 From the Bezirksliga Schleswig-Holstein-Nord:
 TSV Friedrichsberg, 1st
 From the Kreisliga Schleswig:
 FC Sylt-Haddeby

References

Sources
 Deutschlands Fußball in Zahlen,  An annual publication with tables and results from the Bundesliga to Verbandsliga/Landesliga. DSFS.
 Kicker Almanach,  The yearbook on German football from Bundesliga to Oberliga, since 1937. Kicker Sports Magazine
 Die Deutsche Liga-Chronik 1945-2005  History of German football from 1945 to 2005 in tables. DSFS. 2006.

External links 
 Das deutsche Fussball Archiv  Historic German league tables
 The Schleswig-Holstein Football Association (SHFV) 

Schleswig
Football competitions in Schleswig-Holstein
2008 establishments in Germany
Sports leagues established in 2008
de:Verbandsliga Schleswig-Holstein (ab 2008)